This is a list of airlines currently operating in Hungary.

Scheduled airlines

Charter airlines

Cargo airlines

See also
 List of defunct airlines of Hungary
 List of airlines

References

Hungary
Airlines
Airlines
Hungary